Marco Testa (born 3 September 1961) is a retired Swiss football defender.

References

1961 births
Living people
Swiss men's footballers
FC Chiasso players
Swiss Super League players
Association football defenders
FC Chiasso managers
Swiss football managers